Lothkan is a village in Taunggyi Township, Taunggyi District, in the Shan State of eastern Burma. A road connects it to Nawnge in the east and Nampan on the south shore of Inle Lake in the west.

References

External links
Maplandia World Gazetteer

Populated places in Taunggyi District
Taunggyi Township